Demba Diop (10 May 1927 – 3 February 1967) was a Senegalese politician. He served as Minister of Youth and Sport under President Léopold Sédar Senghor and was Mayor of Mbour from 1966 to 1967.

Life 

Born in Boghé (now in Mauritania) in 1927, Diop trained as a school teacher.  He was assigned first to a school in Sédhiou Department in 1947, interrupted by his French Army service.  He later served as an administrator at the Collège moderne in Thiès and at the école régionale at Mbour, where he met his wife.  He was elected to the Assemblée nationale in 1956 (a post of a limited, advisory role in the revised French colonial system under the Loi Cadre of that year). With independence, he was elected to the first Senegalese National Assembly, and served as Minister of Education from 19 December 1962, moving to Minister of Youth and Sport from 9 December 1963, as a member of the ruling Senegalese Progressive Union (Union Progressiste Sénégalaise, UPS). He had been a discus champion as a youth, and helped to found Stade Mbour football club.  He later served as president of the parliamentary group for the UPS, and was elected as Mayor of Mbour in 1966.

Death 
Diop was assassinated on 3 February 1967. On the way to a meeting, he was stabbed in a parking lot in Thiès by Abdou N'Daffa Faye, a partisan of Diop's Mbour political rival (and deputy mayor of Mbour) Jacques d'Erneville. Faye was sentenced to death and was the first person in post-independence Senegal to be executed.

Diop's funeral in Mbour was an episode of national mourning, with President Senghor and Lamine Guèye in attendance.

This political violence, rare in Senegal, has had a long legacy. Opponents of Senghor's Socialist Party, as well as former supporters of Senghor's early rival Mamadou Dia, point to the executions as part of a pattern of suppression of political enemies in Senegal, where these two crimes were used as justification for a witchhunt. Regardless of the truth of these claims, the next year saw repression against violent Dakar student protests in May 68, and the introduction of constitutional changes, approved by the referendum of 22 February 1970, which created a Presidential system, greatly expanding presidential powers in what had become a de facto one party state.

Legacy 

Stade Demba Diop in Dakar, the Lycee Demba Diop, and the city's Boulevard are named for Diop.

His wife, Caroline Faye Diop is also a political leader. She was elected the first female deputy to the National Assembly of Senegal in 1963 and was later a cabinet minister under President Abdou Diouf.

Notes

References 

 Dominique Mataillet. Sénégal : assassinat de Demba Diop. Article, in Jeune Afrique/l'intelligent n°2456, 3 February 2008.
  Vers la suppression totale de la peine de mort en Afrique: l'abolition de la peine de mort au Sénégal. Dominique DUTILLOY, Echo du Village n°346 - 9 June 2005.
  Violence politique : Que dit le livre de Marcel Mendy censuré par la Douane. Sud Quotidien, 23 February 2006.
  EPHEMERIDE DU 2 FEVRIER. Namory Barry, L Observateur, 2 February 2008
  Adrien THOUVENEL-AVENAS L'alternance politique au Sénégal : 1980-2000 Université Sorbonne Paris IV, 2007.
Le non-recours à la peine de mort est une "tradition sénégalaise". La dernière exécution capitale remonte au 15 juin 1967. L'exécuté, Moustapha Lô, avait tenté de tuer à l'époque le Président Léopold Sédar Senghor.
  Elimane Fall, "La démocratie à l'épreuve", Jeune Afrique, n° 1760, 5 octobre 1994.
  Assane Seck. Sénégal, émergence d'une démocratie moderne, 1945-2005: un itinéraire politique. KARTHALA Editions Senegal (2005)  p. 130.
Places the attempt on Senghor's life (1967) within the context of PS rivalries with the partisans of Mamadou Dia, stating that Moustapha Lô was, or was believed to be at the time, a supporter of Dia.
  COMMANDANT ABDOULAYE NDIAYE « Ma lettre à Me Wade retrouvée dans un kiosque de Pmu ». Walf Gran Place: Maké Dangnokho, 19 January 2008.
Reporting the death of former commandant de gendarme­rie Abdoulaye Alphonse Ndiaye, a political opponent of Senghor and army instructor at Dakar-Bango at the time of the assassination attempt on the president (March, 1967). Ndiaye was suspected of involvement, which he denied. Gives the date of Lô's sentencing to death as 28 March 1967.
  Le bâtisseur de la nation et de l’Etat sénégalais. Ibrahima Sarr, Le Soleil, (nd). Places both executions and crimes in 1967, that of Moustapha Lô being the final.
  West Africa : Time to abolish the death penalty: Amnesty International. AI Index: AFR 05/003/2003.
N.B.: This report appears to have been the genesis of a number of international summaries of the death penalty in Senegal, which erroneously places the execution of Moustapha Lô in 1965, reporting the execution of Diop's killer , Abdou N'Daffa Faye, as the last in Senegal. This is incorrect. Lô was executed 15 June 1967, several months after Faye.
  Hands Off Cain database: Senegal. Argentina based anti-Death penalty NGO.

1927 births
1967 deaths
Mayors of places in Senegal
Members of the National Assembly (Senegal)
Political violence in Senegal
Deaths by firearm in Senegal
Assassinated Senegalese politicians
People murdered in Senegal
Members of the National Assembly (France)
Socialist Party of Senegal politicians
1967 murders in Africa
Education ministers of Senegal
Youth ministers of Senegal
Sports ministers of Senegal